Brigitte Wolf (born 7 May 1967) is a Swiss orienteering competitor and ski mountaineer.

Selected results

Orienteering 
Wolf is Relay World Champion as a member of the Swiss winning team in 2003, as well as having a bronze medal from 1997.  She also obtained bronze in the Long distance World Championship in 2003.

Ski mountaineering 
 2004: 5th, Patrouille des Glaciers together with Lucia Näfen and Nathalie Etzensperger
 2004: 10th (women ranking), Patrouille des Glaciers together with Andrea Salzmann and Bernarda Henzen

References

External links
 
 

1967 births
Living people
Swiss female ski mountaineers
Swiss orienteers
Female orienteers
Foot orienteers
World Orienteering Championships medalists
Competitors at the 2001 World Games